Îles-de-la-Madeleine Airport  is located on House Harbour island in the Magdalen Islands, Quebec, Canada. Although it is almost at sea level, nearby land rises significantly to the south, prohibiting circling approaches in that direction. Sea gulls are a frequent concern when landing at Îles-de-la-Madeleine.

The airport is classified as an airport of entry by Nav Canada and is staffed by the Canada Border Services Agency (CBSA). CBSA officers at this airport can handle general aviation aircraft only, with no more than 15 passengers.

Airlines and destinations

The airport was formerly served by Eastern Provincial Airways, Intair and Quebecair when these airlines were in operation.

Accidents and incidents 
On March 29, 2016, a Mitsubishi MU-2 turboprop crashed upon approach to the airport, killing seven people, including former federal Minister of Transport Jean Lapierre, his wife and three of his siblings.

References

External links 

Page about this airport on COPA's Places to Fly airport directory

Certified airports in Gaspésie–Îles-de-la-Madeleine
Magdalen Islands